Jamsheed K. Choksy is a Distinguished Professor and Interim Chair of the Department of Central Eurasian Studies and Director of the Inner Asian and Uralic National Resource Center (US Title VI) at Indiana University - Bloomington. Choksy completed his undergraduate degree from Columbia University in 1985 and doctoral work at Harvard University in 1991. From there, he embarked on a career in academia, beginning as a tenure track professor at Indiana University in 1993, eventually holding appointments in a variety of different programs in the university.

Choksy is considered one of the foremost authorities on Iran, India, Islam, and Zoroastrianism, combining historical understanding to discuss modern issues and topics. An important piece of this research and his pieces in popular press, such as the Huffington Post and other venues, is pulling from his historical understanding of culture and religion to illustrate how different cultures and people in the Middle East and Central Asia interact.

In 2008, he was nominated by President George W. Bush to the National Council on the Humanities and served as a member of the council until 2019.

Awards 
 Fellow, American Academy of Arts and Sciences
 Fellow, American Numismatic Society
 National Endowment for the Humanities Fellowship
 Guggenheim Fellowship
 Member, National Council of the Humanities
 Mellow Fellowship
 American Philosophical Society Fellowship
 Fellow, Royal Asiatic Society of London

References

Living people
Indiana University faculty
Harvard University alumni
Zoroastrian studies scholars
Parsi people
Year of birth missing (living people)
Columbia College (New York) alumni